The Walking Who is the stage name for Australian singer/songwriter, guitarist, sound engineer, music producer, and film-maker, Rohin Brown. The name originated from an Australian psychedelic rock band formed in 2010 and were originally from Wollongong, NSW, Australia

Career 
Early releases include debut album Candy Flu with the single of the same name.

The song received airplay on Sydney's FBi Radio and the Walking Who received 'Unsigned Artist of the Week' March 2011. The music video for "Candy Flu" was named ABC's Rage Indie clip of the week.

Their next single "Have You Seen The Colours" was released in December 2012 and received airplay on FBi Radio and the band appeared on FBI's Lunchbreak. The song has also been played on National Broadcaster Triple J on Richard Kingsmill's '2013' and Dom Alessio on 'Home & Hosed'.  Other Triple J DJ's have written reviews on Triple J Unearthed.

The Walking Who performed around Australia including gigs at The Annandale Hotel, the Alhambra Lounge and Oxford Art Factory.

In 2013 the band independently released an EP, Mansions, and played at the new festival, "Farmer and The Owl", in Wollongong, Australia.

In 2014, The Walking Who won the FBi Radio 'Northern Lights Competition', earning a spot on stage at the Airwaves Festival in Iceland. The band also released a single "With Roses" and performed at the "Pigsty in July" festival. At the end of that year, the band were nominated for two awards at FBi Radio's Sydney Music, Arts and Culture (SMAC) Awards.

In 2015, the band once more played at the "Farmer and the Owl" festival before embarking on a tour of the United Kingdom and parts of Europe, performing alongside The Knife, King Gizzard and the Lizard Wizard. Kurt Vile, and The Flaming Lips at the Citadel Festival, London, UK. That tour also saw the band perform at The Sea Shepherds’ 40th Birthday party in Bordeaux, France (2017).

In 2019, The Walking Who relocated to Europe, settling initially in the UK with the intention of recording in Faust Studio, Prague, Czech Republic. Brown was both locked out of Australia and locked down in Prague during the global pandemic.

The Walking Who’s latest release, ’Mr Cornelius’, was released on October 22, 2021. At that time, Brown announced that a 5 song EP will be released in the coming months.

Brown is a finalist at both the Cannes World Film Festival, and the Sandgrounder International Short Film Festival (UK) - Finalist in Weird and Wonderful Award, for the film entitled “Mr Cornelius”.

Background 
Origin: Formed in Wollongong, NSW, Australia in 2010

Genres: Psychedelic Rock

Years Active: 2010 – present

Label: Independent

Past members/collaborators: Paul McLean, Jay Bird, Steve Hicks and Brad Heald.

Awards and nominations

Sydney Music, Arts and Culture Awards
The Sydney Music, Arts & Culture (SMAC) Awards are presented annually since 2008 by FBi Radio.

|-
|rowspan="2"|SMAC Awards 2014 || "With Roses" || Best Song || 
|-
|The Walking Who || Best Live Act ||

References 

Australian rock music groups
Musical groups established in 2010
People from Wollongong
2010 establishments in Australia